Peter Hirt (30 March 1910 – 28 June 1992) was a racing driver from Switzerland.  He participated in five World Championship Grands Prix, debuting on 27 May 1951.  He scored no championship points.

He was a member of the Ecurie Espadon.

Complete Formula One World Championship results 
(key) 

 Indicates shared drive with Rudi Fischer

References 

1910 births
1992 deaths
Swiss racing drivers
Swiss Formula One drivers
Écurie Espadon Formula One drivers
People from Lenzburg
Sportspeople from Aargau